Judolia longipes is a species of beetle in the family Cerambycidae. It was described by Gebler in 1832.

References

L
Beetles described in 1832